Walter Eggert (18 July 1940 – 2 June 2017) was a German luger. He competed in the men's doubles event at the 1964 Winter Olympics.

References

External links
 

1940 births
2017 deaths
German male lugers
Olympic lugers of the United Team of Germany
Lugers at the 1964 Winter Olympics
People from Ilsenburg
Sportspeople from Saxony-Anhalt
20th-century German people